Staurogyne is a genus of plants in the family Acanthaceae.

Description 
Species of the genus Staurogyne tend to have annual or perennial herbs. They may also have shrubs. The stems of Staurogyne tend to be short.

Species
The genus includes 150 accepted species, of which the most notable are:

 Staurogyne bicolor
 Staurogyne brachystachya
 Staurogyne elegans
 Staurogyne hirsuta
 Staurogyne minarum
 Staurogyne repens
 Staurogyne sichuanica

Distribution 
The genus is widely distributed in the equatorial regions of Africa, Asia and South America.

References 

 
Acanthaceae genera